Perugia's limia (Limia perugiae) is a small fish of the family Poeciliidae endemic to the Caribbean island of Hispaniola (in both Haiti and the Dominican Republic), where it occurs in streams.

Description
It grows to a length of  TL.

Taxonomy
It was described  as Platypoecilus perugiae in 1906 by Barton Warren Evermann and Howard Walton Clark with a type locality given as a small stream in the San Francisco Mountains of the Dominican Republic. The specific name honours the Italian ichthyologist Albert Perugia (1847-1897) of the Museo Civico di Storia Naturale di Genova in recognition of his work on West Indian fishes.

References

Perugias limia
Endemic fauna of Hispaniola
Fish of the Dominican Republic
Taxa named by Barton Warren Evermann
Fish described in 1906